The FESPIC Games or the Far East and South Pacific Games for the Disabled, was a multi-sport event in Asia and the South Pacific region which is considered to be a precursor to the Asian Para Games, as two of its edition games in 1999 (7th) and 2002 (8th) were held parallel to the 1998 Asian Games and the 2002 Asian Games.

The event which started in 1975 was held nine times, and last contested in December 2006 in Kuala Lumpur, Malaysia.

Objectives
 To promote general interest and welfare for the disabled in the region through participation in sports events and other activities
 To deepen mutual understanding and friendship of the disabled
 To promote rehabilitation for the disabled in the region through sports activities

History

The first FESPIC Games was held in Oita, Japan in 1975. There were limited opportunities for persons with disabilities in Asia and the Pacific to participate in sports at the time. The FESPIC Games was launched to address this issue and promote understanding toward disabled persons in each country, as well as improve their social welfare.

The number of participant countries increased during FESPIC history. Central Asian countries Kazakhstan, Uzbekistan, Kyrgyzstan, Turkmenistan and Tajikistan, as well as Armenia and  Azerbaijan, first participated in the 7th FESPIC Games in 1999. The Middle Eastern countries were allowed to compete in the 9th FESPIC Games in 2006, along with East Timor. Middle East countries were previously not allowed to compete in FESPIC Games from 1975 to 2002 because these countries were Africa/Middle Eastern members.

List of FESPIC Games

Of all the nine edition of the FESPIC Games, two of them, the 1999 and 2002 editions were held in the same host city as the Asian Games. The 9th FESPIC Games was the last and final edition of the series which took place in 2006. For Asian countries, the FESPIC Games was replaced by the Asian Para Games, starting with the inaugural 2010 Asian Para Games which was held in Guangzhou, China after the 16th Asian Games.

Youth Games

One Youth Games was held in Hong Kong and serves as the precursor to the Asian Youth Para Games.

Sports

 Athletics
 Cycling
 Football 7 A-Side
 Powerlifting
 Judo
 Chess
Target Sports
 Archery
 Fencing
 Target Shooting
Water Sports
 Sailing
 Swimming

Ball Sports
 Badminton
 Boccia
 Ten-Pin Bowling
 Goalball
 Lawnbowls
 Sitting Volleyball
 Table tennis
 Wheelchair Basketball
 Wheelchair Tennis

See also
 Asian Games
 Asian Para Games
 Disabled sport
 International Paralympic Committee

References

External links
 The official website of 7th FESPIC Games
 The official website of 8th FESPIC Games
 The official website of 9th FESPIC Games
 2010 Asian Games Guangzhou official website 
 Dumapong wins silver in Busan FESPIC
 International Association for Disabled Sailing (IFDS)
 International Paralympic Committee
 Cerebral Palsy International Sport and Recreation Association
 International Blind Sports Association 
 INAS-FID: International Sports Federation for Persons with Intellectual Disability
 International Wheelchair and Amputee Sports Federation
 Discussion forum of Disabled sports
 9th FESPIC Games Past Medal Tally of the FESPIC Games 1999–2006
 International Games (FESPIC Youth Games)
 International Games (FESPIC Games)

 

Defunct multi-sport events
Disabled multi-sport events
Multi-sport events in Asia
Recurring sporting events established in 1975
Recurring sporting events disestablished in 2006